Pamulapadu is a village and a Mandal in Nandyal district in the state of Andhra Pradesh in India. 

Below list of villages comes under this mandal

1. Bhanumukkala

2. Chelimella

3. Iskala

4. Jutur

5. Kambalapalle

6. Maddur

7. Mittakandala

8. Pamulapadu

9. Thummalur

10. Vanala

11. Vempenta

12. Erragudur

Recently  Mekala Bhagyamma  elected as Sarpanch 

Jeevan Kumar Reddy elected as Upa-Sarpanch

References 

Villages in Nandyal district